John Tinsley Russell  (11 November 1904 – 6 September 1942) was an officer in the 2nd New Zealand Expeditionary Force during the Second World War. He was second in command of the New Zealand Divisional Cavalry, and was awarded the Distinguished Service Order. He later commanded the 22nd Battalion until he was killed in action in Egypt in September 1942.

He was the son of Andrew Hamilton Russell, notable for his leadership of the New Zealand Division during the First World War.

Military Decorations 
 Distinguished Service Order - awarded 26 December 1941 
 1939-1945 Star  
 Africa Star 
 New Zealand War Service Medal

Notes

References

1904 births
1942 deaths
People from Hastings, New Zealand
New Zealand Companions of the Distinguished Service Order
New Zealand military personnel killed in World War II
New Zealand Army officers
Rolleston family
Brittan family